Mary Powell may refer to:

 Mary Powell (suffragist) (1854–1946), New Zealand temperance worker and suffragist
 Mary Powell (actress) (died 1723), English stage actress
 Mary Elizabeth Turner (1854–1907), née Powell, English embroiderer
 Mary Alice Powell Lindsay (1883–1979), first registered nurse in Utah